The Wall is a 1967 French drama film directed by Serge Roullet and based on the short story of the same name by Jean-Paul Sartre, who also wrote the dialogue for the film. It was entered into the 17th Berlin International Film Festival.

Plot

During the Spanish Civil War, three men are arrested and imprisoned by General Franco's troops. Pablo is a worker and an associate of the anarchist leader Ramón, who is in hiding; Tom is an English member of the International Brigades; and Juan, still a teenager, is the innocent brother of a militant.  Sentenced to death, they spend their last night together in a cell. A Belgian doctor is sent to watch over them, but they reject all companionship with him. 

At dawn the boy and the Englishman are taken out and shot, while Pablo is sent for further interrogation. Given 15 minutes to say where Ramón is or be shot, he decides to buy himself time by giving an absurd answer. He says Ramón is hiding in the cemetery, and a squad of soldiers rushes off to comb the place. Shortly after, some newly arrested men come in, one of whom knows Pablo. He tells Pablo the sad news: that Ramón broke cover and has just been arrested after taking refuge in a gravediggers' hut.

Cast
 Michel del Castillo as Pablo
 Denis Mahaffey as Tom
 Matthieu Klossowski as Juan
 Anna Pacheco as Concha
 René Darmon as Ramón
 Bernard Anglade as The Doctor
 Jorge Lavelli as Officer

References

External links

1967 films
1960s French-language films
1967 drama films
French black-and-white films
Films directed by Serge Roullet
Films based on short fiction
French drama films
1960s French films